The Serbia women's national water polo team represents Serbia in international water polo competitions and is controlled by the . It was known as the Yugoslavia women's national water polo team until February 2003 and the Serbia and Montenegro national water polo team until June 2006.

European Championship record

 1997 – 9th place
 2006 – 8th place
 2016 – 9th place
 2018 – 9th place
 2020 – 12th place
 2022 – 9th place

Current squad
Roster for the 2020 Women's European Water Polo Championship.

Head coach: Dragana Ivković

Under-20 team
Serbia lastly competed at the 2021 FINA Junior Water Polo World Championships.

References

External links

n
W
Women's national water polo teams